Çayönü  Tepesi is a Neolithic settlement in southeastern Turkey which prospered from circa 8,630 to 6,800 BC. It is located in Diyarbakır Province forty kilometres north-west of Diyarbakır, at the foot of the Taurus mountains. It lies near the Boğazçay, a tributary of the upper Tigris River and the Bestakot, an intermittent stream. It is an early example of agriculture.

Archaeology

The site was excavated for 16 seasons between 1964 and 1991, initially by Robert John Braidwood and Halet Çambel and later by Mehmet Özdoğan and Aslı Erim Özdoğan. The settlement covers the periods of the Pre-Pottery Neolithic A (PPNA), the Pre-Pottery Neolithic B (PPNB), and the Pottery Neolithic (PN).

The stratigraphy is divided into the following subphases according to the dominant architecture:

round,  PPNA
grill, PPNA
channeled, Early PPNB
cobble paved, Middle PPNB
cell, Late PPNB
large room, final PPNB

An analysis of blood found at the site suggested that human sacrifice occurred there.

Origin of domestication

Animal life - domestication of pigs and cattle
Çayönü is possibly the place where the pig (Sus scrofa) was first domesticated.

Farming - cultivation of cereals
Genetic studies of emmer wheat, the precursor of most current wheat species, show that the slopes of Mount Karaca (Karaca Dağ), which is located in close vicinity to Çayönü, was the location of first domestication. A different DNA approach pointed to Kartal Daği.

Robert Braidwood wrote that "insofar as unit HA can be considered as representing all of the major pre-historic occupation at Cayonu, cultivated emmer along with cultivated einkorn was present from the earliest sub-phase."

See also
Cities of the ancient Near East
Göbekli Tepe
Dja'de el-Mughara

Notes

External links

Çayönü from About.com
Çayönü from Ancient Near East

Archaeological sites in Southeastern Anatolia
Neolithic settlements
Former populated places in Turkey
Geography of Diyarbakır Province
Buildings and structures in Diyarbakır Province
Prehistoric Anatolia
Tells (archaeology)
Pre-Pottery Neolithic B
Pre-Pottery Neolithic A
Late Neolithic